The 1934 Star Riders' Championship was decided on a knockout basis over nine heats.

Final 
23 August 1934
 Wembley, England

Heat Details
Heat 1 : Langton, Johnson, Parker, Sharp
Heat 2 : Jackson, Wilkinson, Arthur, Watson
Heat 3 : Lees, Case, Rye, Wotton
Heat 4 : Newton, Haigh, Harrison
Heat 5 : Croombs, Chapman, Murphy

Semi-final 1: Langton, Jackson, Case
Semi-final 2: Lees, Johnson, Newton
Semi-final 3: Parker, Croombs, Harrison

Final : Parker, Langton, Lees

References

See also 

1934
Speedway
1934 in speedway